Verbum Domini (The Word of the Lord) is a post-synodal apostolic exhortation issued by Pope Benedict XVI which deals with how the Catholic church should approach the Bible. He issued it following the XII Ordinary General Assembly of the Synod of Bishops, which had met in October 2008 to discuss "The Word of God in the Life and Mission of the Church." Verbum Domini is dated September 30, 2010, for the Feast of St. Jerome, the patron saint of Biblical studies.

The document use the Prologue of John's Gospel as a guide because it reveals Jesus, the "Word made flesh" who "dwelt among us".

The apostolic exhortation states that God seeks dialogue with humankind. At the Incarnation, the Word became flesh and lived among us.

See also 
 Scripturae sacrae affectus

References

External links 
 Official English text

Apostolic exhortations
Documents of Pope Benedict XVI
Catholic theology and doctrine
Biblical exegesis
2010 documents
2010 in Christianity